Agelaea himalayica is a species of ground beetle from the Platyninae subfamily that is endemic to Nepal.

References

Beetles described in 1965
Endemic fauna of Nepal
Beetles of Asia